The Twelve-Pound Look may refer to:
The Twelve-Pound Look, a 1914 one-act play by J. M. Barrie
The Twelve Pound Look (1920 film), a British silent version of Barrie's play
The Twelve-Pound Look (1956 film), an Australian television performance of Barrie's play